KF Ramiz Sadiku (Klubi Futbollistik Ramiz Sadiku) is a football club from Kosovo which is playing in the 2nd level (Liga 1) in Kosovo. The club have been 1 time Champions on the regional Kosovar Superliga and that was in the 1982/1983 season. It is named for Ramiz Sadiku.

Football clubs in Kosovo
Association football clubs established in 1950
Sport in Pristina